Hassan Nour-el-Din Aman (born May 7, 1943) is an Egyptian-Chadian boxer. He competed in the men's light heavyweight event at the 1968 Summer Olympics. At the 1968 Summer Olympics, he lost to Jürgen Schlegel of East Germany.

Hassan represented Chad at the 1972 Summer Olympics in Munich in the Light-heavyweight class, in the first round he was drawn against Yugoslavian Mate Parlov, he was stopped in the second round, Mate Parlov went on to win the gold medal.

References

1943 births
Living people
Egyptian male boxers
Olympic boxers of Egypt
Boxers at the 1968 Summer Olympics
Chadian male boxers
Olympic boxers of Chad
Boxers at the 1972 Summer Olympics
Sportspeople from Cairo
Light-heavyweight boxers